Arthur Gordon Maling (June 11, 1923 – October 24, 2013) was an American writer of crime and thriller novels. He graduated from Francis W. Parker School, Chicago in 1940; in 1944 he received a B.A. from Harvard University. In the Second World War Maling was an ensign in the U.S. Navy from 1944 to 1945. From 1945 to 1946 he was a reporter for The San Diego Journal. After 1946, he worked as an executive manager for Maling Brothers, a retail shoe chain.

Bibliography

Brock Potter Series
 Ripoff (1976)
 Schroeder's Game (1977)
 Lucky Devil (1978)
 Koberg Link (1979)
 A Taste of Treason (1983)

Other novels
 Decoy (1969)
 Go-Between (UK Title: Lambert's Son)  (1970)
 Loophole (1971)
 The Snowman (1973)
 Dingdong (1974)
 Bent Man (1975)
 Mystery Writer's Choice (1978)
 The Rheingold Route (1979); Winner of the Edgar Award.
 From Thunder Bay (1981)
 Lover and Thief (1988)

References

1923 births
20th-century American novelists
American crime fiction writers
American male novelists
Harvard University alumni
2013 deaths
20th-century American male writers

Francis W. Parker School (Chicago) alumni